Greater Lowell Technical High School is a public vocational high school in Tyngsborough, Massachusetts, United States, part of the Greater Lowell area. The school was founded in 1967 as Lowell Trade School, and then later became Greater Lowell Regional Vocational Technical High School. The name was again changed to Greater Lowell Technical High School. The school serves the city of Lowell and the towns of Tyngsborough, Dracut, and Dunstable. Local nicknames for the school include "Gltech", "The Voc", and "The Tech".

There are 23 technical programs available for students to choose from during their Freshman year at the school. An on-site restaurant is run by the Culinary Arts students, along with a Lowell 5 Bank that is run by the Marketing & Business Education students. Each student has a chance to obtain a Co-Op job during their junior and senior years at the school. A Co-Op job allows a student to directly participate in the workforce as opposed to attending school during their shop week. The majority of the student population at Greater Lowell are from the City of Lowell and the Town of Dracut. However, there are also numerous students from Tyngsborough and Dunstable. With nearly 2300 students, it is the largest vocational high school in Massachusetts and also one of the 10 largest high schools in the state.

Demographics
The demographic breakdown of the 2,296 students enrolled for the 2020–2021 school year was:
 African American - 5.2%
 Asian - 17.%
 Hispanic - 36.1%
 Native American - 2.0
 White - 38.3%
 Multi-Race, Non-Hispanic - 3%

Available Shops
Below is a list of all the available shops in the school as of 2023. The list is in alphabetical order. After each official shop name you will find common nicknames or short hand names used at the school
Advanced Manufacturing (Ad-Fab)
Automotive Collision and Repair (Auto Body or Auto Collision)
Automotive Technology (Auto Tech)
Computer Aided Draft and Design (CADD)
Carpentry
Cosmetology (Cosmo)
Culinary Arts (Culinary)
Design & Visual Communications (DVC)
Early Childhood Education (Early Childhood)
Electrical
Electronics
Engineering Technology (Engineering)
Graphic Communications (Graphics)
Health Assisting (Health)
Heating, Ventilation, Air Conditioning, and Refrigeration (HVAC or HVACR)
Hospitality Management (Hospitality)
Information Technology Services (IT)
Marketing Education (Marketing)
Masonry
Medical Assisting (Medical)
Metal Fabrication and Joining (Metal Fab)
Painting and Design (P&D)
Plumbing

The Exploratory Program
The Exploratory Program is a program where Freshman or 9th grade students attend a 6-day sampling of every shop. This version of the Exploratory Program was put in place for the 2022–2023 school year. A previous Exploratory Program is known as the Pre-Exploratory Program, and included a 1-day Pre-Exploratory sample of every shop. During these Pre-Exploratories shop instructors would give a brief introduction of what is done in the shop and what you will get if you join this shop. These Pre-Exploratory days would then be followed by 7 day programs for each shop.  Before the school year started students would pick a total of 13 shops to explore for seven days. Any shops that were not selected at the beginning of the year would not be explored. The Pre-Exploratory Program was abolished in favor of the current Exploratory Program as Pre-Exploratories were deemed not worth the time. This was also done in response to complaints of the inability to sample every shop in the school from parents and students. During the last Exploratory students would choose the shops, via a ranking system, that they would work in for their high school career. The ranking system had 4 options. Students had the highest likelihood to receive their 1st choice and the 4th choice has the lowest likelihood. An extremely rare occurrence can happen where a student receives none of the shops on their rankings. This can happen due to a mixture of poor Exploratory grades, poor Academic grades, and or poor attendance. Receiving this is known around the school as "Going Bust". After the last Exploratory is completed students would begin attending shop.

The Artisan
The Artisan is a student run and operated Restaurant. It is run more specifically by the Culinary Arts program at the school. The Artisan is open from Tuesday through Friday. Reservations can be done from 11:00 PM – 12:30 PM and to go orders can be done from 10:00 AM  – 12:45 PM. There are several entrees, a salad bar, homemade soup, and specialty sandwiches according to the  Artisan's Website. The phone number for reservations can also be found on this site. The Artisan is also able to host functions as it is equipped with display technology for PowerPoint presentations. The contact for booking the Artisan for a function can also be found on the Artisan's Website.

References

External links
Official website
 
 

Commonwealth Athletic Conference
Educational institutions established in 1967
Schools in Middlesex County, Massachusetts
Public high schools in Massachusetts